Sarah Jane Smith: Test of Nerve is a Big Finish Productions audio drama based on the long-running British science fiction television series Doctor Who. It stars Elisabeth Sladen reprising her role as Sarah Jane Smith. It was released 5 September 2002.

Plot 
The London Underground will suffer a horrific terrorist attack unless Sarah Jane can stop it. Will she have to sacrifice a close friend in order to save a city?

Cast
Sarah Jane Smith – Elisabeth Sladen
Josh Townsend – Jeremy James
Natalie Redfern – Sadie Miller
Claudia Coster – Caroline Burns-Cook
James Carver – Roy Skelton
Harris – Robin Bowerman
Ellie Martin – Juliet Warner
DI Morrison – Mark Donovan

Trivia
The London Underground was previously the setting for the Doctor Who story The Web of Fear. James Carver is played by Roy Skelton, who was a voice of the Daleks for over thirty years.

External links
Big Finish Productions – ''Sarah Jane Smith: Test Of Nerve

Test of Nerve
2002 audio plays
Plays by David Bishop